George Howe (10 January 1924 – 10 November 1971) was an English footballer who played as a defender.

Career
Born in Wakefield, West Yorkshire, Howe joined Huddersfield Town from non-League side Carlton United in May 1942. He joined York City in June 1954, where he was a part of the team which played in the FA Cup semi-final in 1955. He retired from playing after spending the 1961–62 in the reserve team. He died suddenly at the age of 47 on 10 November 1971.

References

1924 births
Footballers from Wakefield
1971 deaths
English footballers
Association football defenders
Huddersfield Town A.F.C. players
York City F.C. players
English Football League players